Raymond Ernest Brand (born 2 October 1934) is an English former footballer who played as a centre half in the Football League for Millwall and Southend United.

References

1934 births
Living people
English footballers
Footballers from Islington (district)
Association football defenders
Hatfield Town F.C. players
Southend United F.C. players
Millwall F.C. players
Hastings United F.C. (1948) players
English Football League players